Churchstoke Football Club is a Welsh football team based in Church Stoke, a village in Montgomeryshire, Powys, Wales, who play in the Montgomeryshire League.

History
The club was originally formed in 1920.

The current incarnation of the club was formed in 2010.

They were joined the Mid Wales Football League Division Two for the 2014–15 season and at the end of the 2016–17 finished as runners-up, gaining promotion to Division One. After finishing third from the bottom of the table in 2017–18, the following season they finished bottom of the table and were relegated.

In July 2020 the club was announced as one of the new tier 4 clubs in the restructured East Division of the Mid Wales Football League. The club had planned to play in the  Central Wales League Northern Division for the 2022–23 season but withdrew from the league.  They subsequently joined the tier 5 Montgomeryshire League for the 2022–23 season.

Honours

Mid Wales Football League Division Two - Runners-up: 2016–17

External links
 Club official Twitter

References

Association football clubs established in 1920
1920 establishments in Wales
Football clubs in Wales
Sport in Powys
Mid Wales Football League clubs
Montgomeryshire Football League clubs